PK-11 Upper Dir-II is a constituency for the Khyber Pakhtunkhwa Assembly of the Khyber Pakhtunkhwa province of Pakistan.

Election 2002 
General elections were held on 10 October 2002.

Election 2008 
General elections were held on 2008

Election 2013 
General elections were held in Pakistan on 11 May 2013 to elect the members of Provincial Assembly Of Khyber-Pakhtunkhwa.

Disqualification 
Jamaat-e-Islami MPA Malik Behram Khan disqualified over fake degree. He was elected as MPA on a JI ticket from Constituency PK-93 (Upper Dir-III) in the general elections, 2013.

The runner-up candidate of Pakistan People's Party (PPP), Sahibzada Sanaullah had challenged Behram's victory, alleging that the JI candidate had submitted a fake bachelor's degree with his nomination papers for the 2013 general election.

The Election Tribunal's presiding officer Justice (R) Shah Jee Rehman issued the verdict on an election petition of rival candidate from Pakistan People's Party, Sahibzada Sanaullah, who accused the MPA of possessing dubious graduation degree and impersonation during an examination.

“After hearing arguments from both the parties, examining statements of official witnesses and records of Malakand University regarding BA degree, the JI MPA does not fulfill the requirements of Sadiq and ‘Ameen under Articles 62 and 63 of the Constitution and thus he stands disqualified as MPA of the Khyber Pakhtunkhwa Assembly,” the tribunal stated in its short order. -

The university cancelled the degree of Malik Behram on ground of impersonation. It had observed that different persons had appeared instead of him to take the graduation part-1 and part-2 examinations in 2005 and 2007, respectively.

Upon enquiry and verification of the degree from the University of Malakand, the tribunal found the allegations against Behram to be true. The tribunal has directed the Election Commission of Pakistan to hold re-election in the constituency.

The JI candidate had secured 13,580 votes followed by 9,799 votes in favour of the PPP candidate. Behram is currently the chairman of the standing committee on finance and a member of the committees on administration, home and tribal affairs and communication and works.

Re-Election In PK-93 
Pakistan People's Party's (PPP) Sahibzada Sanaullah has defeated Malik Azam (son of Malik Behram Khan, former MPA) of Jamaat Islami (JI) in Upper Dir PK-93 by-election. The seat fell vacant after disqualification of former MPA Behram Khan of Jamaat-e-Islami in a fake degree case in July. According to details, Sahibzada Sanaullah bagged 23,291 votes while the runner-up Malik Azam could only secure 19,290 votes. Sanaullah won by a margin of 4001 votes while the turnout remained around 33%. It was considered to be JI's stronghold previously.

See also
 PK-10 Upper Dir-I
 PK-12 Upper Dir-III

References

External links 
 Khyber Pakhtunkhwa Assembly's official website
 Election Commission of Pakistan's official website
 Awaztoday.com Search Result
 Election Commission Pakistan Search Result

Khyber Pakhtunkhwa Assembly constituencies